The slaty spinetail or slaty castlebuilder,  (Synallaxis brachyura), is a passerine bird which breeds in the tropical New World from northern Honduras to western Ecuador and east-central Brazil.
 
It is a member of the South American bird family Furnariidae, a group in which many species build elaborate clay nests, giving rise to the English name for the family of "ovenbirds".

However, the slaty spinetail constructs a bulky spherical stick nest  36x43 cm in size, with a long tubular entrance, 0.4–4.5 m high in a shrub or vine covered tree. It lays two or three greenish white eggs.

This species is a widespread and common resident breeder in lowlands and up to 1500 m altitude in a range of scrubby habitats, including second growth, road and river edges, and overgrown pasture.

The slaty spinetail is typically 15 cm long, and weighs 18.5 g. It is a slender bird with a long, pointed wispy tail. The plumage is mainly dark grey-brown becoming dark grey on the head. The crown and shoulder patches are rich rufous.

Sexes are similar, but young birds are duller and browner with a yellowish chin.

The slaty spinetail is an insectivore which is difficult to see as it forages for beetles, caterpillars and other prey deep in tangled thickets, but may be located by its hard  call.

References

 Stiles and Skutch,  A guide to the birds of Costa Rica

Further reading

slaty spinetail
Birds of Nicaragua
Birds of Costa Rica
Birds of Panama
Birds of Colombia
Birds of Ecuador
Birds of the Tumbes-Chocó-Magdalena
slaty spinetail